Saraya Wa'ad Allah, also known as the Waad Allah Brigades, is a Bahraini Shiite militant group. The group currently is designated as a terrorist group by Canada, Bahrain, Egypt, Saudi Arabia, the U.S., the U.A.E,  and Israel. The group has claimed responsibility for 3 attacks.

Ideology 
The group has stated its pro-Iran stance. The group has often criticized the U.S. for it involvement in the Middle East. The group has also declared to sabotage Israeli interests in Bahrain.

References 

Organizations based in Asia designated as terrorist
Organizations designated as terrorist by Bahrain
Organizations designated as terrorist by Canada
Organizations designated as terrorist by Egypt
Organizations designated as terrorist by Israel
Organizations designated as terrorist by Saudi Arabia
Organizations designated as terrorist by the United States
Organisations designated as terrorist by the United Kingdom
Organizations designated as terrorist by the United Arab Emirates
Khomeinist groups
Axis of Resistance
Islamism in Bahrain